In elementary geometry, Reuschle's theorem describes a property of the cevians of a triangle intersecting in a common point and is named after the German mathematician Karl Gustav Reuschle (1812–1875). It is also known as Terquem's theorem after the French mathematician Olry Terquem (1782–1862), who published it in 1842.

In a triangle  with its three cevians intersecting in a common point other than the vertices ,  or  let ,  and  denote the intersections of the (extended) triangle sides and the cevians. Reuschle's theorem now states that the three new cevians ,  and  intersect in a common point as well.

References 
Friedrich Riecke (ed.): Mathematische Unterhaltungen. Volume I, Stuttgart 1867, (reprint Wiesbaden 1973), p. 125 (German)
M. D. Fox, J. R. Goggins: "Cevian Axes and Related Curves." The Mathematical Gazette, volume 91, no. 520, 2007, pp. 3-4 (JSTOR).

External links 
Terquem's theorem at cut-the-knot.org
 

Elementary geometry
Theorems about triangles and circles